The Levstik Award is a literary award in Slovenia awarded for achievements in children's literature. It has been bestowed since 1949 by the Mladinska Knjiga Publishing House, making it the first literary award established by a Slovene publishing house after the Second World War. It includes a prize for original works of literature, original illustrations, and non-fiction books for children. Up until 1989 it was awarded annually. Since then it has been awarded biannually. In the prize category for books only books published by the Mladinska Knjiga Publishing House are eligible for entry, but since 1999 the award for lifetime achievements in children's literature is the most prestigious award of its kind in Slovenia. The award is named after the 19th century Slovene writer, political activist and playwright Fran Levstik who also wrote works for children.

Levstik Award laureates

References

External links

 The Levstik Award on the Mladinska Knjiga Publishing House site

 
Slovenian literary awards
Awards established in 1949